Dehnow is a village in Aspas Rural District, Sedeh District, Eqlid County, Fars Province, Iran. At the 2006 census, its population was 141, in 32 families.

References 

Populated places in Eqlid County